Frank, Viscount De Winne (born 25 April 1961, in Ledeberg, Belgium) is a Belgian Air Component officer and an ESA astronaut. He is Belgium's second person in space (after Dirk Frimout). He was the first ESA astronaut to command a space mission when he served as commander of ISS Expedition 21. ESA astronaut de Winne serves currently as Head of the European Astronaut Centre of the European Space Agency in Cologne/Germany (Köln).

Education
De Winne graduated in 1979 from the Royal School of Cadets in Lier. In 1984, he graduated from the Royal Military Academy with the degree of Master of Sciences in Engineering (Polytechnics).

Military career
De Winne followed the elementary flying school of the Belgian Air Component at Goetsenhoven. After graduating he flew Dassault Mirage 5 airplanes for the Air Force until he was attached to SAGEM in Paris to work on the safety of the Mirage. In 1991, De Winne completed the Staff Course at the Defence College in Brussels with the highest distinction. In 1992, De Winne received his degree as test pilot from the British Empire Test Pilots' School in Boscombe Down, receiving the McKenna Trophy as well.

From December 1992, Major of Royal Belgian Air Component De Winne operated as a test pilot for the Belgian Air Force. From January 1994 until April 1995, he was responsible for flight safety of the 1st Fighter Wing operating from Beauvechain air base. From April 1995 to July 1996, he was attached as senior test pilot to the European Participating Air Forces at Edwards Air Force Base in California where he worked on the mid-life update of the F-16 aircraft, focusing on radar testing. From 1996 to August 1998, he was senior test pilot in the Belgian Air Force, responsible for all test programmes and for all pilot-vehicle interfaces for future aircraft/software updates.

On 12 February 1997 De Winne encountered engine problems while flying in an F-16 Fighting Falcon over densely populated area near Leeuwarden. After the onboard computer failed, De Winne was faced with the choice of crashing in the IJsselmeer or of ejecting over densely populated area. However, De Winne was able to land his crippled plane at Leeuwarden air base, a feat which earned him the Joe Bill Dryden Semper Viper Award, the first non-American ever to get this award.

In August 1998, De Winne became commander of the 349 Squadron operating from Kleine Brogel. During the NATO Operation Allied Force in the Balkans, De Winne commanded the Dutch-Belgian Deployable Air Task Force. He completed 17 combat sorties. For his achievement during this operation, the Dutch government awarded him the degree of Officer of the Order of Orange-Nassau.

De Winne has collected over 2.300 flying hours in Mirage, F-16, Tornado and Jaguar.  He also serves as the Chairman of the Belgian Armed Forces Flying Personnel Association.

He currently holds the rank of Brigadier-General.

Astronaut career

In October 1998, Frank De Winne was selected as an astronaut candidate by the European Space Agency. In January 2000, he joined the European Astronaut Corps, whose homebase is the European Astronaut Centre in Cologne, Germany. He provided technical support for the X38 Crew Return Vehicle project division within the Directorate of Manned Spaceflight and Microgravity, located at the European Space Research and Technology Centre in Noordwijk, the Netherlands. In August 2001, De Winne took up training at the Yuri Gagarin Cosmonauts Training Center near Moscow, Russia. Training included elements of Basic Training for the International Space Station as well as training as a Soyuz flight engineer.

De Winne's first spaceflight (30 October - 10 November 2002) was a trip as a flight engineer to the International Space Station in 2002, traveling to the station aboard Soyuz TMA-1 and returning aboard Soyuz TM-34. During his time in space, De Winne carried out successfully a programme of 23 experiments in the fields of life and physical sciences and education.

He was the back-up crew member for Léopold Eyharts of ISS Expedition 16.

On 20 September 2007 ESA announced that De Winne would take part in a six-month mission aboard the International Space Station in 2009. On 21 November 2008, NASA announced changes to the Expedition schedule, with De Winne becoming Commander of Expedition 21. On 27 May 2009 De Winne launched aboard Soyuz TMA-15, becoming the first astronaut from the European Space Agency to command a space mission.

Honors and awards

  Officer of the Order of Leopold
  Officer of the Order of the Crown
  Officer of the Order of Leopold II
  Military Cross 1st class
  Campaign Medal for foreign operations
  NATO Medal for Kosovo
  Officer of the Order of Oranje-Nassau (Netherlands)
  Member of the Order of Friendship (Russian Federation)
 Royal Aeronautical Society Silver Medal (2010)
 McKenna Trophy
 Joe Bill Dryden Semper Viper Award
 On 20 December 2002 Frank De Winne was ennobled a viscount in the Belgian nobility as a reward for his space achievements.
 In 2003, De Winne received an honorary doctorate from Hasselt University.
 Honorary doctorate from University of Antwerp
 Honorary doctorate from Ghent University
 Honorary doctorate from University of Liège
 Honorary doctorate form University of Mons

Personal
De Winne is married to Lena Clarke De Winne. He has three children from a previous marriage. He enjoys football, small PC applications and gastronomy. De Winne appeared on screen during the concerts of rock band U2 on their 360° Tour (and on their U2360° at the Rose Bowl concert video) in pre-recorded segments from the International Space Station, reciting lines from the band's songs "Your Blue Room" and "In a Little While".

References

External links

ESA profile page
Spacefacts biography of Frank De Winne

1961 births
Living people
Belgian astronauts
Crew members of the International Space Station
Commanders of the International Space Station
Belgian Air Component officers
Air force generals
Royal Military Academy (Belgium) alumni

Viscounts of Belgium
Officers of the Order of the Crown (Belgium)
Officers of the Order of Leopold II
Officers of the Order of Orange-Nassau
Royal Aeronautical Society Silver Medal winners
Military personnel from Ghent
20th-century Belgian military personnel
21st-century Belgian military personnel
20th-century Belgian engineers
21st-century Belgian engineers
Dutch-speaking astronauts